Écardenville may refer to two communes in the Eure department in northern France:
 Écardenville-la-Campagne
 Écardenville-sur-Eure